Jacob Ford may refer to:
 Jacob Ford (American football)
 Jacob Ford (politician)